El Carrizal is a municipality located in the department of Chalatenango in the North of El Salvador.

Municipality
El Carrizal is a municipality in the department of Chalatenango, El Salvador, bordered to the north and east by Honduras; to the southeast by Ojos de Agua and Las Vueltas; and to the west and northwest by La Laguna. It has a territorial extensión of 25.32 km2.  For its administration the municipality is divided into four cantones and 22 caseríos, but according to the Parcipative Development Plan with Strategic Project for the Municipality of El Carrizal, only 18 caseríos exist.

History
The civilization of El Salvador dates from the Pre-Columbian Era, from around 1500 BC, according to experts (Embajada).  On May 31, 1522, the first of the Spanish, under the leadership of Captain Pedro de Alvarado, disembarked on the Isla Meanguera, located in the Gulf of Fonseca (Embajada).  In June 1524 Captain Alvarado began a war of conquest against the indigenous people of Cuzcatlán (land of precious things).  After 17 days of bloody battles many people died but the Spanish were not defeated, so they continued their conquest (Embajada).  During the following centuries the Spanish maintained their control, with European families controlling the land and the native and African slaves (Lonely Planet).  Towards the end of 1810 the Priest José Matías Delgado, with the support of many people, began a rebellion (Embajada).  After years of struggle, the Central American Independence Act was signed in Guatemala, on September 15, 1821 (Embajada).

According to don Antonio Gutiérrez y Ulloa, in 1807 El Carrizal was a prosperous village of non-indigenous peoples near Chalatenango, on the road “Gracias a Dios” (Thanks to God).  According to the law, on February 18, 1841, the village of El Carrizal, along with those of Vainillas and Petapa, constituted one of the electoral cantones which divided El Salvador.  
From June 12, 1824, to May 22, 1835, it belonged to the department of San Salvador; from May 22 until February 14, 1855, it was a part of Cuscatlán; and from this date on, has formed a part of the department Chalatenango.
Many families from El Carrizal descend from Honduran families, specifically from Guarita and other towns in the Lempira Department.

Due to the repression of the landowners, in 1931 farmers and indigenous citizens began a rebellion (Lonely Planet).  The army responded by killing 30,000 people, including the leader of the rebellion, Farabundo Martí, in a bloody act that was later referred to as La Matanza (The Massacre) (Lonely Planet).  But the people remained unhappy with the government.  This began a movement organized around leftist guerrillas to combat the repression violence (Stahler-Sholk, 1994:2).  The government responded with violence, and the Death Squads were formed, which eventually tortured and killed thousands of people (Foley 2006).  More political instability and the assassination of Archbishop Oscar Romero in 1980 sparked the beginning of the Civil War (Lonely Planet).  This war, which lasted 12 years, resulted in the death of an estimated 75,000 people and the displacement of thousands more (Stahler-Sholk, 1994:3).  The Peace Accords were signed on January 16, 1992 (Embajada).

The department of Chalatenango was heavily impacted by the Civil War.  Many people of El Carrizal were forced to abandon their homes because of the violence.  But beginning the early 1990s, and especially after the Peace Accords, the people have returned to repopulate the municipality.

In 1992, according to the national census, the population of El Carrizal was 2,727.  523 people (19%) were urban, and 2,234 people (81%) were rural.  According to the information given by community leaders, in August 2004 there were 2,806 inhabitants; 54% were women and 46% were men, and there was a total of 618 families.  (Tomado de: Plan Participativo de Desarrollo con Proyección Estratégica, Municipio El Carrizal Departamento de Chalatenango, FUNDAMUNI, PROCAP, El Salvador octubre 2004)

Cantónes and their caseríos
Trinidad:	
Trinidad,
Aldea Vieja,
Santa Cruz,
Callejones,
Sitio Las Cañas,
Sitio Vado Las Cañas,
Sitio Viejo

Petapa:	
Petapa,
Petapita,
Sitio Vado Olosingo,
La Junta,
Valle Los Santos,
La Quesera

Potrerillos:	
Potrerillos,
Los Planes,
Teosinte,
San Cristóbal
El Teosinte,
Crujillitas,
El Limón

Vainillas:	
Vainillas,
El Limo,
El Pucuyo

History of cantones y caseríos
Many of the caseríos are now uninhabited since the Civil War, such as Sitio Vado Las Cañas, Sitios Las Cañas, Crujillitas, and Pucuyo.  At the same time there are now newly populated areas that are not identified as official caseríos, such as El Camalote-Brisas de la Paz or El Plan de Abajo.

All of the cantones and the urban center have  (Associations for Community Development—ADESCOS), and all are functioning.  In addition, all of the rural schools have ACE and the school in the urban area has a CDE.  There are also several different committees and boards that administer water services, sports activities)

In total there are 630 houses in the municipality.  200 (32%) are made of cement blocks, brick, and cement; 422 (67%) are made out of adobe; and 8 (1%) are a material similar to adobe, called bahareque.

Cantón Vanillas: named because there used to be vanilla (vanilla) plants
Potrerillo: named because there used to be big areas of land used as pastures (potreros).
Petapa: named because the patron Saint is Santa Marta de Petapa
Petapita: or valley of the Saints, named after the extended family named Santos (Saints) that lives there.
Petapon: the location of the church and the centre of Cantón Petapa
Junta: the place where the Río Sumpul and the Río La Garza join (“junta” means “together”)
La Quesera: a caserío in Petapa where they used to make cheese (queso)

Politics
There are two main political parties in El Salvador, whose roots lie in the Civil War (Foley 2006, Stahler-Sholk 1994).  The main right-wing party is La Alianza Republicana Nacionalista (Nactionalist Republican Alliance—ARENA), founded on September 30, 1981, and was in power during the last few wars of the Civil War (ARENA 2007).  The Frente Farabundo Marti para La Liberacion Nacional (Farabundo Martí National Liberation Front—FMLN) the socialist party, is the direct descendant of the guerrilla troops that fought against the Salvadoran government, and was legally constituted as a political party on September 1, 1992 (Stahler-Sholk 1994:3).  Since the Civil War the two have remained the country's principal political parties, still divided by the left-right binary.  Today ARENA describes itself as a party in whose “forming principals express that a democratic and representational system, which guarantees the freedom of action and the consequences of individual peaceful goals, are the quickest and stablest path to achieve integral development of the nation” (ARENA 2007). The FMLN “has begun to take steps…to act as a consequence of the historically created challenges,  in order to make the party an organization of ‘social fighters…’and ‘to unify more’ the struggle for power (Comisión Nacional de Educación Política 2002).  Other political parties in El Salvador include The Christian Democratic Party, The United Democratic Center, and The Party of National Conciliation.

The mayor of El Carrizal is Tulio Ernesto Casco, of the FMLN party.

Religion
83% of the population of El Salvador identifies as Roman Catholic, and the other 17% identify as “other” (CIA World Factbook).  But in the last few years the population of Catholicism has been reduced (USBDHRL).  There is a lot of Protestant activity in the country, and El Salvador has one of the highest rates of Protestantism in Latin America (Soltero y Saravia 2003:1).  There is no doubt that religion plays an important role in the lives of many people.  Patron-saint and other religious festivals are still very important and celebrated in almost all of the municipalities in the country, and almost all the cantones have their own patron-saint in whose honor the festival is celebrated.

Patron Saint and traditional festivals
El Carrizal: December 4–8, in honor of the immaculate conception of Mary
Petapa: June 13, in honor of San Antonio.
Caserío Petapita: May 13, in honor of the Virgin Fátima
Potrerillos: June 6, in honor of the Sacred Heart of Jesus
Caserío Los Planes: December 27, in honor of the Niño Jesus
Vainillas: October 4, in honor of San Francisco de Asís; November 21–22, in honor of St. Christopher
Cantón Trinidad: May 27–28, in honor of the Divine Trinity

Music and dances
Before only rancheras and some boleros were heard.  Popular instruments included mandolins, guitars, accordions, marimbas, and violins.  There were also drums made out of leather. This music is now no longer heard.

La Raspa used to be a popular dance.

Agricultural production
Traditionally the area has produced corn and beans.  In individual farms, people plant beans, different types of local squash, tomatoes, loroco, blackberries, cucumber, yucca, jicama, herbs, and peppers.  One can still see the remains of sugar cane mills.

Food and drink
Traditional foods include beans, tortillas, metas, soups, sweets, and seeds.  Other traditional foods and dishes include:

During the corn harvest they make atole and tamales.
Montucas, which are corn tamales filled with meat and vegetables.
Bean soup with chopped mangoes.
Potocs, which are balls of corn dough which are added to the beans when they are cooking.
Tamales pisques, which are made to last for long travel.
Pupusas (a stuffed corn tortilla) with beans and oregano.
After going fishing they make fish pupusas.

The majority of the ingredients used to make these foods and drinks are natural and are grown in the area.  They also form part of the biodiversity that, in some cases, is threatened or in danger of extinction.  Nevertheless, these habits are less common as more people eat commercially produced foods.

Tourism sites
The natural pools of Sumpul River.
In the stream El Rodeo there are waterfalls.  There is also a natural pool and cave underneath the waterfall, which actually is located in Honduras.
In the forest of La Montañona, there is a commonly owned piece of land which belongs to the municipality.
The caves of Piedra Gato
The Piedra del Gallinero, which according to the populace is the home of a little boy of a famous local legend.
The Bat Cave that is located below Vainillas and Sumpul.

Artisan products
In Petapa the make hammocks.
There are two places that make ironworks and machetes (made by Don Pedro Santos 1925–2007); these are permanent productions in the municipality
There are people who can make pottery, such as: pots, water jugs, tortilla pans, and whistles.
Among other artisanal works, there are people who can make the following: candies out of fruit, caramel, coconut conserve, chocolate, donkey milk; dolls out of corn husks; paper crowns; woven mats; soaps of olives, beans, and avocado; alcoholic drinks, mild and strong.
Before they used to make drums out of leather that were used at festivals; today one can still find older people who make and play them.

Archaeological sites
In Camalote, in the Cooperative “Breezes of Peace,” there are rocks, pots, and cups.  There is also a knoll where people have found fire stones.
In Cantón Potrerillos they have found pots, water jugs, and a rock with a cow footprint engraved.
In Ciprés there is a rock that sounds like a bell.
In Sumpul River there is obsidian some of the large rocks near Petapa
In Cantón Trinidad there are rocks with engravings

References

NOTE: Unless otherwise cited, all information extracted from Martínez Alas et al. "Diagnostico Cultural Municipio de El Carrizal, 2005."  Reprinted with express permission of the Unidad Tecnica Intermunicipal de La Mancomunidad la Montañona, who commissioned the report.
ARENA. 2007.  “Nuestra Historia.” Retrieved December 6, 2007.
CIA World Factbook.  November 15, 2007. “El Salvador.” Retrieved December 5, 2007.
Comisión Nacional de Educación Política.  2002.  “Historia del FMLN.” Retrieved December 6, 2007.
Embajada de El Salvador en EE. UU. (Embajada), De la Civilización a la Independencia. Retrieved December 4, 2007.
Foley, Michael W.  2006.  Laying the Groundwork: The Struggle for Civil Society in El 	Salvador.  Journal of Interamerican Studies and World Affairs.  38 (1): 67–104.
Lonely Planet.  “El Salvador Background Information.” Retrieved December 3, 2007.
Martínez Alas, José Salomón, Aguilardo Pérez Yancky, Ismael Ernesto Crespín Rivera, and Deysi Ester Cierra Anaya.  2005.  “Diagnostico Cultural Municipio de El Carrizal, 2005.”  El Instituo para Rescate Ancestral Indígena (RAIS): El Salvador.
Stahler-Sholk, Richard.  1994.  El Salvador's Negotiated Transition: From Low-Intensity Conflict to Low-IntensityDemocracy. Journal of Interamerican Studies and World Affairs.  36 (4): 1-59.
US Bureau of Democracy, Human Rights, and Labor (USBHRL).  November 8, 2005.  “International Religious Freedom Report 2005.”

Municipalities of the Chalatenango Department